Parrot is the remains of a lunar impact crater that has been almost completely worn away. It was named after Russian doctor and physicist Friedrich Parrot. It is attached to the southern rim of the crater Albategnius, and is located among the rugged highlands among the south-central part of the visible Moon. To the east is the small crater Vogel, and in the southeast is Arzachel.

Little remains of the southwestern rim of Parrot, and the other sections of the wall have been worn and smoothed by impact erosion. The remains of a pair of overlapping craters occupy much of the northern floor of the crater, and the remainder is irregular but relatively flat. No central peak remains.

A groove structure intersects the southeast and part of the northern rim, following an intermittent line from the south-southeast to the north-northwest.

Satellite craters

By convention these features are identified on lunar maps by placing the letter on the side of the crater midpoint that is closest to Parrot.

References

External links

Parrot at The Moon Wiki

Impact craters on the Moon